"Driver's High" is the eighteenth single by L'Arc-en-Ciel, released on August 11, 1999 it reached number 2 on the Oricon chart. The title track was used as the first opening theme for the anime adaptation of Great Teacher Onizuka. Mary's Blood recorded a heavy metal version of the song for their 2020 cover album Re>Animator.

Track listing

* Remix by Yukihiro.

References

1999 singles
L'Arc-en-Ciel songs
Songs written by Hyde (musician)
Songs written by Tetsuya (musician)
Anime songs
1999 songs
Ki/oon Music singles